"Ronnie" is a song by Bob Gaudio and Bob Crewe. The Four Seasons recorded and released the original version in 1964. The recording reached the #6 position on the Billboard Hot 100 singles chart.

Cash Box said that it is "sparked by a hard-driving arrangement that deftly complements the 'Seasons' sound."

References

The Four Seasons (band) songs
1964 singles
Songs written by Bob Crewe
Songs written by Bob Gaudio
Song recordings produced by Bob Crewe
1964 songs
Philips Records singles